Einat Shlain is an Israeli diplomat. 

Shlein was the first female to serve as an Israeli Ambassador to an Arab country. She was appointed ambassador to Jordan in 2014.

References

Israeli women ambassadors
Ambassadors of Israel to Jordan
Year of birth missing (living people)
Living people